The General Treasurer of Rhode Island is one of the five general state officers directly elected by the voters and serves as the custodian of state funds for the Rhode Island government. The General Treasurer is tasked with managing the state's finances and serves on a variety of boards and commissions. The current General Treasurer is Democrat James Diossa.

Responsibilities 

The General Treasurer "is responsible for the safe and prudent management of the State’s finances." The Office of the General Treasurer has stated that its mission is " to protect the state's assets with sound financial investments, strengthen the state’s financial position, encourage economic growth, operate with transparency and accountability, and ensure Rhode Islanders benefit from exceptional performance through all of the programs the office manages." As part of this mission, the General Treasurer's Office "reconciles and disburses most state funds, issues general obligation notes and bonds, manages the investment of state funds, and oversees the retirement system for state employees, teachers, state police, judges and some municipal employees" and "is also responsible for the management of the Unclaimed Property Division and the Crime Victim Compensation Program as well as oversight of the investments for the state-sponsored CollegeBound fund."

The General Treasurer also serves on the board of the Rhode Island Infrastructure Bank, the State Investment Commission, the State Retirement Board, the Public Finance Management Board, the Rhode Island Housing and Mortgage Finance Corporation, the Rhode Island Student Loan Authority and the Rhode Island School Building Authority, and he co-chairs of the Rhode Island School Building Task Force.

Officeholders

See also
State of Rhode Island
Governor of Rhode Island
Secretary of State of Rhode Island
Attorney General of Rhode Island
Rhode Island General Assembly

References

Government of Rhode Island
State treasurers of the United States